Samuel Hildreth may refer to:

 Samuel Hildreth (American Revolution) (1750–1823), surgeon in the Massachusetts militia
 Samuel Prescott Hildreth (1783–1863), physician, scientist and historian
 Sam Hildreth (1866–1929), American horse racing trainer and owner